Hamed Fallatah (Arabic:حامد فلاته; born 3 December 1992) is a football player who plays as a midfielder for Al-Jabalain on loan from Al-Faisaly.

Career
Fallatah started his career at Al-Ettifaq and signed his first contract with the club on 9 January 2011. On 15 August 2013, Fallatah left Al-Ettifaq and joined city rivals Al-Nahda. He made his debut for Al-Nahda on 7 February 2014 in the league match against Al-Taawoun. He went on to make three more appearances as Al-Nahda suffered relegation to the First Division. On 19 August 2019, Fallatah renewed his contract with Al-Nahda for another year. On 3 July 2020, Fallatah joined Al-Faisaly on a three-year contract. On 22 January 2021, Fallatah rejoined Al-Nahda on loan until the end of the season. On 24 July 2021, Fallatah joined Al-Tai on loan until the end of the 2021–22 season. On 4 September 2022, Fallatah joined Al-Jabalain on loan.

External links

References

1992 births
Living people
Saudi Arabian footballers
Ettifaq FC players
Al-Nahda Club (Saudi Arabia) players
Al-Faisaly FC players
Al-Tai FC players
Al-Jabalain FC players
Saudi Professional League players
Saudi First Division League players
Association football midfielders